Giovanni Innocenzo Martinelli OFM (5 February 1942, in El Khadra, Libya – 30 December 2019, in Saccolongo, Italy) was an Italian Roman Catholic prelate, who was a Vicar Apostolic of Tripoli and the Titular Bishop of Tabuda.

Life

Martinelli was born in Italian Libya, but moved to Italy with his family when he was a child. He was ordained as a Roman Catholic priest in 1967 and returned to Libya in 1971.

In 1985, he was appointed the Vicar Apostolic of Tripoli and the Titular Bishop of Tabuda.

During the civil war in Libya he made an appeal, unheeded by the western states, not to humiliate Gaddafi, but to seek dialogue with him. Martinelli was one of the few who understood that without Gaddafi Libya would be in threat of a civil war.

He then strongly condemned the NATO bombings during the 2011 military intervention in Libya.

In February 2015, during the Libyan crisis for the control of the provinces of Barqa and Tripoli by ISIS, Martinelli refused to leave the country and was the last Italian left in that territory. He received death menaces, but he declared to be ready for martyrdom if necessary and remained next to the last 300 Catholics in Libya.

He had severe health problems and had to retire to Italy leaving for good Libya on 22 October 2015. He then presented his resignation to Pope Francis on 5 February 2017, his 75th birthday. Pope Francis accepted his renunciation and coadiutor Bishop George Bugeja, who was already in Tripoli before Martinelli's departure in 2015, took over. His health slowly continued to deteriorate and he was taken care of in the elderly care center of the Friars Minor of Saccolongo, where he died on 30 December 2019.

See also
 Catholic Church in Libya
 Italian Libya

References

External links 

The Hierarchy of the Catholic Church - Bishop Giovanni Innocenzo Martinelli, O.F.M.
GCatholic.org - Apostolic Vicariate of Tripoli

|-

1942 births
2019 deaths
20th-century Roman Catholic bishops in Libya
21st-century Roman Catholic bishops in Libya
Libyan Friars Minor
Libyan people of Italian descent
Roman Catholic bishops of Tripoli